67th ACE Eddie Awards
January 27, 2017

Feature Film (Dramatic): 
Arrival

Feature Film (Comedy or Musical): 
La La Land

The 67th American Cinema Editors Awards were presented on January 27, 2017 at the Beverly Hilton Hotel, honoring the best editors in films and television. The event was hosted by Rachel Bloom.

Winners and nominees 

Winners will be listed first, highlighted in boldface.

Film 
Best Edited Feature Film – Dramatic:

Joe Walker – Arrival
 John Gilbert – Hacksaw Ridge
 Jake Roberts – Hell or High Water
 Jennifer Lame – Manchester by the Sea
 Nat Sanders and Joi McMillon – Moonlight

Best Edited Feature Film – Comedy or Musical:

Tom Cross – La La Land
 Julian Clarke – Deadpool
 Roderick Jaynes – Hail, Caesar!
 Mark Livolsi – The Jungle Book
 Yorgos Mavropsaridis – The Lobster

Best Edited Animated Feature Film:

Fabienne Rawley and Jeremy Milton – Zootopia
 Christopher Murrie – Kubo and the Two Strings
 Jeff Draheim – Moana

Best Edited Documentary Feature:

Bret Granato, Maya Mumma and Ben Sozanski – O.J.: Made in America
 Spencer Averick – 13th
 Matthew Hamachek – Amanda Knox
 Paul Crowder – The Beatles: Eight Days a Week – The Touring Years
 Eli B. Despres – Weiner

Television 
Best Edited Half-Hour Series for Television:

Steven Rasch – Veep: "Morning After"
 Brian Merken – Silicon Valley: "The Uptick"
 Shawn Paper – Veep: "Mother"

Best Edited One Hour Series for Commercial Television:

David L. Bertman – This Is Us: "Pilot"
 Skip Macdonald – Better Call Saul: "Fifi"
 Skip Macdonald and Curtis Thurber – Better Call Saul: "Klick"
 Kelley Dixon and Chris McCaleb – Better Call Saul: "Nailed"
 Philip Harrison – Mr. Robot: "eps2.4_m4ster-s1ave.aes"

Best Edited One Hour Series for Non-Commercial Television:

Tim Porter – Game of Thrones: "Battle of the Bastards"
 Yan Miles – The Crown: "Assassins"
 Dean Zimmerman – Stranger Things: "Chapter One: The Vanishing of Will Byers"
 Kevin D. Ross – Stranger Things: "Chapter Seven: The Bathtub"
 Stephen Semel and Marc Jozefowicz – Westworld: "The Original"

Best Edited Mini-Series or Motion Picture for Television:

Carol Littleton – All the Way
 Jay Cassidy – The Night Of
 Adam Penn, Stewart Schill and C. Chi-yoon Chung – The People v. O. J. Simpson: American Crime Story: '"Marcia, Marcia, Marcia"

Best Edited Documentary for Television:

Bob Eisenhart – Everything is Copy (Nora Ephron: Scripted & Unscripted)
 Steve Audette – The Choice 2016
 Oliver Lief – We Will Rise: Michelle Obama’s Mission to Educate Girls Around the World

Best Edited Non-Scripted Series:

Mustafa Bhagat – Anthony Bourdain: Parts Unknown: "Senegal"'
 Hunter Gross – Anthony Bourdain: Parts Unknown: "Manila"
 Josh Earl and Alexander Rubinow – Deadliest Catch: "Fire at Sea: Part 2"

Special awards

The Heritage Award
 Lori Jane Colman
 Diana Friedberg
 William Gordean

Career Achievement Award
 Janet Ashikaga
 Thelma Schoonmaker

Filmmaker of the Year Award
 J. J. Abrams

References

External links

67
2016 film awards
2016 guild awards
2016 in American cinema